The Peanut Man may refer to:
 Rick Kaminski (1944-2011), Seattle stadium vendor and businessman
 The Peanut Man (film), about George Washington Carver